USS Sproston (DD-173) was a  built for the United States Navy during World War I.

Description
The Wickes class was an improved and faster version of the preceding . Two different designs were prepared to the same specification that mainly differed in the turbines and boilers used. The ships built to the Bethlehem Steel design, built in the Fore River and Union Iron Works shipyards, mostly used Yarrow boilers that deteriorated badly during service and were mostly scrapped during the 1930s. They had a crew of 6 officers and 108 enlisted men.

Performance differed radically between the ships of the class, often due to poor workmanship. The Wickes class was powered by two steam turbines, each driving one propeller shaft, using steam provided by four water-tube boilers.

The ships were armed with four 4-inch (102 mm) guns in single mounts and were fitted with two  1-pounder guns for anti-aircraft defense. Their primary weapon, though, was their torpedo battery of a dozen 21 inch (533 mm) torpedo tubes in four triple mounts. In many ships a shortage of 1-pounders caused them to be replaced by 3-inch (76 mm) anti-aircraft (AA) guns. They also carried a pair of depth charge rails. A "Y-gun" depth charge thrower was added to many ships.

Construction and career
Sproston, named for John G. Sproston, was laid down on 20 April 1918 by Union Iron Works, San Francisco, California; launched on 10 August 1918; sponsored by Mrs. George J. Dennis; and commissioned on 12 July 1919.

Sproston sailed to Hawaii and was assigned to the Pacific Fleet in the fall of 1919. On 17 July 1920, the ship was reclassified from a destroyer to a Light Minelayer (DM-13) and continued operating at Pearl Harbor until 1922. On 15 August 1922, Sproston was decommissioned there and attached to the reserve fleet. She was struck from the Navy list on 1 December 1936 and sunk as a target on 20 July 1937.

Notes

References

External links
 NavSource Photos

 

Sproston (DD-173)
Ships built in San Francisco
1918 ships
Maritime incidents in 1937
Ships sunk as targets
Shipwrecks in the Pacific Ocean
Wickes-class destroyer minelayers